Alfred Lagarde (2 April 1948 – 1 January 1998) was a Dutch radio personality.

Born in Groningen, Lagarde presented the hard rock radio program Betonuur from 1974 to 1979. Lagarde was a great proponent of hard rock and heavy metal; he also produced the first single of Dutch-language hard rock act Vandale, in 1979.

Lagarde performed the original voice of Telly on Sesamstraat, the Dutch co-production of Sesame Street. After a few brief appearances, Telly became a main character in the late 1980s. His Dutch name is Teevee Monster, or simply Teevee ("tay-vay"). 

When Lagarde died, Fred Meijer became the new dubbing voice of Telly.

References

External links
 Site dedicated to Alfred Lagarde

1948 births
1998 deaths
Dutch male voice actors
People from Groningen (city)
20th-century Dutch male actors